Dedeh Erawati (born May 25, 1979 in Sumedang) is an Indonesian sprint hurdler. She is a four-time medalist and two-time defending champion at the Southeast Asian Games. She won the bronze medal at the 2009 Asian Athletics Championships in Guangzhou, China, with a time of 13.32 seconds, finishing behind Japan's Asuka Terada and China's Sun Yawei, who claimed the gold in the hurdles. She also set both her personal best and national record of 13.18 seconds at the 2012 Taiwan Open in Taipei, Taiwan.

Erawati represented Indonesia at the 2008 Summer Olympics in Beijing, where she competed for the women's 100 m hurdles. She ran in the fifth and final heat against seven other athletes, including Jamaica's Brigitte Foster-Hylton, and Dawn Harper of the United States, who later dominated this event by winning an Olympic gold medal. She finished the heat in seventh place by twenty-four hundredths of a second (0.24) behind Haiti's Nadine Faustin, with a slowest possible time of 13.49 seconds. Erawati, however, failed to advance into the semi-finals, as she placed thirty-fourth overall, and ranked below two mandatory slots for the next round.

Other Achievements

References

External links

NBC 2008 Olympics profile

Indonesian female hurdlers
Living people
Olympic athletes of Indonesia
Athletes (track and field) at the 2008 Summer Olympics
People from Sumedang
1979 births
Athletes (track and field) at the 2010 Asian Games
Athletes (track and field) at the 2014 Asian Games
Sportspeople from West Java
Southeast Asian Games medalists in athletics
Southeast Asian Games gold medalists for Indonesia
Southeast Asian Games silver medalists for Indonesia
Competitors at the 2005 Southeast Asian Games
Competitors at the 2007 Southeast Asian Games
Competitors at the 2009 Southeast Asian Games
Competitors at the 2011 Southeast Asian Games
Competitors at the 2015 Southeast Asian Games
Asian Games competitors for Indonesia
Islamic Solidarity Games competitors for Indonesia
Islamic Solidarity Games medalists in athletics
20th-century Indonesian women
21st-century Indonesian women